Digital Extremes is a Canadian video game developer founded in 1993 by James Schmalz. They are best known for creating Warframe, a free-to-play cooperative online action game, and co-creating Epic Games' Unreal series of games. Digital Extremes is headquartered in London, Ontario. In 2014, 61% of the company was sold to Chinese holding company Multi Dynamic, now Leyou, for $73 million.  President James Schmalz and two partners retained 39% of Digital Extremes, and will continue to manage it. On May 22, 2016 Leyou exercised a call option and increased their stake to 97% of Digital Extremes for a total consideration of $138.2 million US. On December 23, 2020, Tencent bought Leyou for 1.3 billion dollars, which included the majority stake in Digital Extremes that Leyou held. Now, Digital Extremes is owned by Tencent.

History
Founder James Schmalz created Epic Pinball, published by then shareware publisher, Epic MegaGames. Bolstered from the success of Epic Pinball and the rising technology movement in the mid-'90s toward realistic 3D graphics, Schmalz founded Digital Extremes in 1993 and the company began co-development with Epic on what would become Epic's Unreal franchise.

Unreal is a first-person shooter, released in 1998, and was followed up with Unreal Tournament in 1999, which received numerous industry awards. Subsequent sequels in the Unreal franchise include Unreal Championship, Unreal Tournament 2003, and Unreal Tournament 2004.  The Unreal series has sold more than 15 million units worldwide across a multitude of game platforms including PlayStation 2, Dreamcast, Xbox, PlayStation 3, Xbox 360, Mac and PC.

According to Scott Miller, the cofounder of the video game company 3D Realms, Digital Extremes was willing to take over development of their much-delayed game Duke Nukem Forever in 2004. However, the proposal was rejected by others at 3D Realms, which Miller described as a "fatal suicide shot" for the project.

After years of working in the same universe with Unreal, Digital Extremes broadened its library and technology with development of its original intellectual property, Dark Sector.  A third-person shooter released in 2008 for PlayStation 3, Xbox 360 and PC, Dark Sector used Digital Extremes' proprietary game engine, the Evolution Engine.

Digital Extremes worked with 2K to develop the comic-book franchise video game sequel, The Darkness II, which met with positive reviews. Digital Extremes developed the PlayStation 3 version of BioShock, as well as developed the multiplayer component of the sequel, BioShock 2, while simultaneously developing the multiplayer portion of THQ's first-person shooter Homefront.

Digital Extremes developed the game for the 2013 Star Trek Into Darkness film, working with Bandai Namco and Paramount to develop Star Trek, which was very poorly received.

On October 14, 2014, Sumpo Food Holdings Ltd. acquired a majority share of Digital Extremes, with Perfect World Co. acquiring minority shares. Sumpo was rebranded as Leyou in 2015, and by June 2016, had purchased the remaining shares in Digital Extremes.

In 2016, it was revealed that Digital Extremes' game Warframe had been hacked, exposing the email addresses of more than 700,000 players.

On October 6, 2017, Digital Extremes announced it would open a development studio in Toronto, Canada, set to begin operations the following month.

Leyou was acquired by Tencent on December 23, 2020, which included Digital Extremes. The developer stated this would not change how they operate as they remained independent of Tencent, though through Tencent they would be able to provide better support for the Chinese version of the Warframe client.

Projects
Digital Extremes started development of Warframe, a free-to-play title, in 2000. Digital Extremes launched Warframe on PC in March 2013, PlayStation 4 in November 2013, and on Xbox One in September 2014. At TennoCon 2018, Digital Extremes announced it would bring Warframe to Nintendo Switch. The company released Warframe on Nintendo Switch on November 20, 2018. Digital Extremes continues to refresh this games-as-a-service title on a regular basis with updates including "Plains of Eidolon" (October 2017), "The Sacrifice" (June 2018), "Fortuna" (November 2018), the Nightwave series (February 2019), "The Jovian Concord" (May 2019), "Empyrean" (Christmas 2019), "Heart of Deimos" (August 2020), "The New War" (December 2021), and the upcoming "Duviri Paradox".

Digital Extremes worked with developer n-Space to develop the fantasy role-playing video game, Sword Coast Legends, set within the Dungeons & Dragons franchise.

Digital Extremes worked with Madison, Wisconsin-based developer Human Head Studios to publish Survived By, a free-to-play bullet-hell MMO with crafting and role-playing elements. Survived By was shut down as of April 19, 2019.

During TennoCon 2022, Digital Extremes announced Soulframe, an upcoming fantasy MMORPG. It also announced that it would be publishing a massively multiplayer online game from Airship Syndicate.

Technology

Evolution is Digital Extremes' proprietary game engine. The engine made its debut with Dark Sector; and was again utilized in The Darkness II. 2013's Star Trek featured use of the Evolution engine; and the engine is currently in use on the free-to-play online title Warframe, released on PC in 2013.

Awards and recognition
Since the launch of Warframe, its expansion and popularity has grown, resulting in multiple awards. In late 2017, Warframe won the Steam Labor of Love award, an award nominated by Steam's internal team, but voted on by players. The award is described by Steam as: "This game has been out for a while. The team is well past the first unveiling of their creative baby, but being the good parents they are, these devs continue to nurture and support their creation. This game, to this day, is still getting new content after all these years."  Warframe was nominated in The 2017 and 2018 Game Awards as one of the Best Ongoing Games, losing to Overwatch and Fortnite, respectively.

In early 2018, Warframe won the People's Voice Webby Award for Best Action Game, and ProMax's Best Marketing Campaign of the Year Award. In March 2018, Noclip, published the video documentary on the making of Warframe. The two-part feature tells the story of how Warframe succeeded as an independently developed and published game that changed the course of Digital Extremes.

Digital Extremes' employment environment has been recognized as one of Canada's Top Employers for 2010, 2011, 2012 and through to 2018. Additionally, the company has been recognized as one of Canada's top employers for Young People.  In 2010 and 2011, the Financial Post named Digital Extremes one of the 10 best companies to work for in Canada.

On the provincial level, Digital Extremes received the Ontario Small Business Award in 2010. Digital Extremes was also presented with the Large Business of the Year award in 2011 from the London Chamber of Commerce. Digital Extremes was also awarded the Excellence in Human Resources award from The London Chamber of Commerce in early 2012.

Games developed

Further reading

References

External links
 
 https://www.scmp.com/tech/policy/article/3145836/why-tencent-spent-us13-billion-buy-video-gaming-firm-leyou-left-it

Canadian companies established in 1993
Video game companies established in 1993
1993 establishments in Ontario
Video game companies of Canada
Video game development companies
Companies based in London, Ontario
2016 mergers and acquisitions
Canadian subsidiaries of foreign companies
Tencent